The State Home and School for Dependent and Neglected Children was the first state home for needy children in the state of Rhode Island.  It was located on a campus in what was originally rural western Providence, on a former gentleman's farm.  The school was established in 1884 and operated until 1979, when its remaining functions were taken over by other state organizations.  Most of its surviving grounds and buildings are now on the Rhode Island College East Campus, and have been listed as a historic district on the National Register of Historic Places.

History

Prior to the founding of this school, neglected and needy children (either orphans or those whose parents could not care for them) were typically handled at the local or county level in poor houses.  In 1884 the state purchased a  farm in what was then rural western Providence, which was adapted for use as a school and home.  The facility was modeled on the State Public School at Coldwater, Michigan, and was built in the "cottage style", with home-like dormitories and a central administration building.  The original stone farmhouse, built in 1870, was adapted for use as the superintendent's residence.

Yellow cottage

The early dormitories were wood frame structures, of which only the "Yellow Cottage" (originally known as Cottage C) survives today.  The school experienced significant growth in its first several decades, necessitating the construction of additional cottages and a schoolhouse.  None of these have survived, the casualties of replacement done when the facility was modernized in the 1950s.  The school's principal function came under criticism for extreme overcrowding, and the state began emphasizing placement of needy children in foster homes instead.  Updated views of the treatment of children in the institution also prompted the demolition of most of the older cottages in favor of more modern residential facilities in the 1950s, with an emphasis on short-term stays.

The facility continued to suffer from management and treatment issues, and was finally closed in 1979, its functions taken over by the state Department of Children, Youth , and Families.  Rhode Island College had established its current campus adjacent to the facility in 1958, and began to take over the former school buildings and grounds in the 1990s.

See also
National Register of Historic Places listings in Providence, Rhode Island

References

Historic districts in Providence County, Rhode Island
Geography of Providence, Rhode Island
National Register of Historic Places in Providence, Rhode Island
Historic districts on the National Register of Historic Places in Rhode Island